Desmond Lee (1908–1993), was an English classical scholar.

Desmond Lee may also refer to: 

 Desmond Lee (Singaporean politician) (born 1976)
 Desmond Lee (Hong Kong politician) (born 1944)
 Desmond Lee (basketball) (born 1990)
 Des Lee, musician in The Miami Showband

See also
 Desmond Lee-Wortley, character in The Adventure of the Christmas Pudding